Vikrče is a settlement on the left bank of the Sava River southeast of the town of Medvode in the Upper Carniola region of Slovenia.

Name
Vikrče was attested in written sources in 1394 as Weykers, and in 1436 as Waikers. The name probably developed from the plural demonym *vykъrčane 'people living on cleared land', derived from the noun *vykъrčь 'cleared land'. A less likely possibility is that the name is derived from the Old High German personal name Wîchart.

References

External links

Vikrče on Geopedia

Populated places in the Municipality of Medvode